Cereus haageanus is a species of columnar cactus found in Paraguay.

References

External links
 
 

haageanus
Cacti of South America